Quilty GAA is a defunct Gaelic Athletic Association club in County Clare, Ireland. The club was based in Quilty The club only played gaelic football.

The club won three times the Clare Senior Football Championship. Most remarkable is the win of 1935, when they played the final against their fellow parishioners and later amalgamation partners Kilmurry Ibrickane.

In the 1970s Quilty GAA and Kilmurry Ibrickane amalgamated to form Kilmurry Ibrickane GAA.

Honours
 Clare Senior Football Champions (3): 1935, 1936, 1939
 Clare Football League Div. 1 (Cusack Cup) (3): 1933, 1934, 1935
 Clare Junior A Football Championship (1): 1933

References

Gaelic games clubs in County Clare
Gaelic football clubs in County Clare